Shivendra Singh (born 9 June 1983 in Gwalior, Madhya Pradesh) is a former Indian field hockey player who played as a centre forward in the Indian team.

Career

2010
He scored two field goals in a thrilling match against Pakistan in Commonwealth Games, Delhi which India won by 7-4.

Hockey India League
In the auction of the first edition of the Hockey India League, Singh was bought by Punjab Warriors for $27,500 with his base price being $18,500.

Controversy
Shivendra was awarded a two match ban for "deliberately hitting" Pakistan's Fareed Ahmed during a FIH world cup 2010 match which India won by 4-1.

References

External links
 
 
The Fans of Hockey - Devoted to hockey lovers

Living people
Field hockey players at the 2010 Commonwealth Games
Asian Games medalists in field hockey
World Series Hockey players
Field hockey players at the 2012 Summer Olympics
Field hockey players from Madhya Pradesh
Olympic field hockey players of India
1983 births
Field hockey players at the 2006 Asian Games
Field hockey players at the 2010 Asian Games
Indian male field hockey players
Asian Games bronze medalists for India
Commonwealth Games silver medallists for India
Commonwealth Games medallists in field hockey
Medalists at the 2010 Asian Games
Hockey India League players
2006 Men's Hockey World Cup players
2010 Men's Hockey World Cup players
Medallists at the 2010 Commonwealth Games